D'Oyly or Doiley is an English-language surname. It originates from the Norman French name d'Ouilly, from the place-name Ouilly in Calvados, Lower Normandy, France.

List of persons with the surname
Nigel D'Oyly, Lord of Oxford Castle and Wallingford Castle
Robert D'Oyly (Osney), founder of Osney Abbey
Robert D'Oyly, founder of Oxford Castle and High Sheriff of Berkshire
Sir John D'Oyly, 6th Baronet of Shottisham was MP for Ipswich 1790–1796

See also

D'Oyly baronets, a number of British baronetcies
D'Oyly Carte (disambiguation)
Mr. Doiley, supposed inventor of the doily
Ysmeria Doyley, mother of Lakan Dula, Rajah Suleiman and Rajah Matanda of the Philippine royal family
George D'Oyly Snow, schoolmaster and Bishop
Guy D'Oyly-Hughes, British naval officer in the First World War and the Second World War
Thomas D'Oyly Snow, British General in the First World War
Flatulence, for which "d'Oyly" became Cockney rhyming slang through the rhyming of "d'Oyly Carte" with "fart" and subsequent omission of the second portion "Carte"

References

Surnames